San Javier (Beni) is a small town in Bolivia.

Languages
Camba Spanish is the primary vernacular lingua franca spoken in the town. Javierano, a Moxo dialect, is the main indigenous language spoken.

References

Populated places in Beni Department
Jesuit Missions of Moxos